Millions is a 1936 British comedy film directed by Leslie Hiscott and starring Gordon Harker, Richard Hearne and Frank Pettingell. It was made at Elstree Studios. The film portrays the cut-throat rivalry between two financiers. It is known by the alternative title The King of Cloves.

Plot
Wealthy businessman and financier Otto Forbes has cut off his son Jimmy's allowance. Jimmy's valet Parsons comes up with a scheme to restore Jimmy to his father's good graces. The elder Forbes loves music, so Parsons suggests Jimmy "compose" a beautiful piece. Since Jimmy has no musical talent or training, Parsons tries to pass off works, such as a Beethoven sonata, as Jimmy's, but Forbes is not fooled, leaving Jimmy in deep financial trouble.

Forbes and bitter business rival Sir Charles Rimmer are running against each for Parliament. Jimmy meets and becomes enamoured with Rimmer's daughter, Jane.

Cast
 Gordon Harker as Otto Forbes 
 Frank Pettingell as Sir Charles Rimmer 
 Richard Hearne as Jimmy Forbes 
 Stuart Robertson as The Conductor 
 Anthony Holles as Billy Todd 
 Jack Hobbs as Parsons 
 Ernest Sefton as Naseby
 Alexander Field as The Brokers' Man 
 Queenie Leonard as Lilian 
 Jane Carr as Jane Rimmer

References

Bibliography
Wood, Linda. British Films, 1927–1939. British Film Institute, 1986.

External links

Millions on BFI

1937 films
1937 comedy films
1930s English-language films
British black-and-white films
British romantic comedy films
Films directed by Leslie S. Hiscott
Films set in London
Films shot at British International Pictures Studios
1930s British films